The 1897 international cricket season was from April 1897 to September 1897. Only few first-class matches were held during the season with no any international tours.

Season overview

References

International cricket competitions by season
1897 in cricket